Ali Bouabé (born March 7, 1979) is a Moroccan footballer who played in defence.

Career
Bouabé currently plays for K.S.C. Lokeren Oost-Vlaanderen, as a midfielder.

During his professional career, Bouabé represented local KAC Kenitra (2000–03), FAR Rabat (2003–04), moving subsequently to Belgium with K.S.C. Lokeren Oost-Vlaanderen. After four years in Belgium, Bouabé came back to Morocco to sign with FUS Rabat.

International career 
Bouabe made five appearances for the Moroccan national team before his retirement.

References

External links

Profile and stats – Lokeren

1979 births
Living people
Moroccan footballers
Moroccan expatriates in Belgium
Association football midfielders
Belgian Pro League players
K.S.C. Lokeren Oost-Vlaanderen players
Morocco international footballers
People from Kenitra